Moed ("Festivals") is the second Order of the Mishnah, the first written recording of the Oral Torah of the Jewish people (also the Tosefta and Talmud).  Of the six orders of the Mishna, Moed is the third shortest.  The order of Moed consists of 12 tractates:

 Shabbat: or Shabbath ("Sabbath") deals with the 39 prohibitions of "work" on the Shabbat. 24 chapters.
 Eruvin: (ערובין) ("Mixtures") deals with the Eruv or Sabbath-bound - a category of constructions/delineations that alter the domains of the Sabbath for carrying and travel. 10 chapters.
 Pesahim: (פסחים) ("Passover Festivals") deals with the prescriptions regarding the Passover and the paschal sacrifice. 10 chapters.
 Shekalim: (שקלים) ("Shekels") deals with the collection of the half-Shekel as well as the expenses and expenditure of the Temple. 8 chapters
 Yoma: (יומא) ("The Day"); called also "Kippurim" or "Yom ha-Kippurim" ("Day of Atonement");  deals with the prescriptions Yom Kippur, especially the ceremony by the Kohen Gadol. 8 chapters.
 Sukkah: (סוכה) ("Booth"); deals with the festival of Sukkot (the Feast of Tabernacles) and the Sukkah itself.  Also deals with the Four Species (Lulav, Etrog, Hadass, Aravah — Palm branch, Citron, Myrtle, Willow) which are waved on Sukkot. 5 chapters.
 Beitza: (ביצה) ("Egg"); (So called from the first word, but originally termed, according to its subject, Yom Tov -  "Holidays") deals chiefly with the rules to be observed on Yom Tov. 5 chapters.
 Rosh Hashanah: (ראש השנה) ("New Year") deals chiefly with the regulation of the calendar by the new moon, and with the services of the festival of Rosh Hashanah. 4 chapters.
 Ta'anit: (תענית) ("Fasting") deals chiefly with the special fast-days in times of drought or other untoward occurrences. 4 chapters
 Megillah: (מגילה) ("Scroll") contains chiefly regulations and prescriptions regarding the reading of the scroll of Esther at Purim, and the reading of other passages from the Torah and Neviim in the synagogue. 4 chapters.
 Mo'ed Katan: (מועד קטן) ("Little Festival") deals with Chol HaMoed, the intermediate festival days of Pesach and Sukkot. 3 chapters.
 Hagigah: (חגיגה) ("Festival Offering") deals with the Three Pilgrimage Festivals (Passover, Shavuot, Sukkot) and the pilgrimage offering that men were supposed to bring in Jerusalem. 3 chapters.

The Jerusalem Talmud has a Gemara on each of the tractates, while in the Babylonian, only that on Shekalim is missing. However, in most printed editions of the Babylonian Talmud (as well as the Daf Yomi cycle), the Jerusalem Gemara to Shekalim is included.

In the Babylonian Talmud the treatises of the order Mo'ed are arranged as follows: Shabbat, 'Erubin, Pesachim, Rosh ha-Shanah, Yoma, Sukkah, Beitzah, Hagigah, Mo'ed Katan,  Ta'anit, Megillah; while the sequence in the Jerusalem Talmud is Shabbat, Eruvin, Pesachim, Yoma, Sheqalim, Sukkah, Rosh ha-Shanah, Beitzah, Ta'anit, Megillah, Hagigah, Mo'ed' Katan.

On the Festivals, some have the custom to learn the Tractate in this Order which details the laws of that respective festival. (e.g. they would learn Tractate Rosh Hashanah on the holiday of Rosh Hashanah).

Tabernacle and Temples in Jerusalem